Ampasimadinika is a rural commune in the district of Toamasina II (district), in the region of Atsinanana, on the northern part of the east coast of Madagascar.
It is situated along the National road RN 2.

Economy
The economy is based on agriculture. Rice is grown, other crops are lychee, cloves and coffee.

References

Populated places in Atsinanana